The Lucius Gleason House, also known as Liverpool Village Hall and as the Gleason Mansion, is a historic home located at Liverpool, Onondaga County, New York.  It was built about 1860, and is a large two-story, Italianate style, stuccoed brick dwelling.  It has a telescoping plan with a two-story, hip roofed main block; followed by a smaller two-story, gable roofed wing; and a -story gabled appendage. The Gleason Mansion is now home to the Liverpool Village Museum and Historian's office. Operated by the Liverpool Historical Association, the museum features changing exhibits about local history.

It was listed on the National Register of Historic Places in 1990.

References

External links
  Village Historian and Liverpool Village Museum - Village of Liverpool

Houses on the National Register of Historic Places in New York (state)
Historic American Buildings Survey in New York (state)
Italianate architecture in New York (state)
Houses completed in 1860
Houses in Onondaga County, New York
Museums in Onondaga County, New York
National Register of Historic Places in Onondaga County, New York